Kama is a given name and surname found among many cultures, developed independently from one another, throughout the world.

The name is common among the Serer people in West Africa.

It may refer to:

Surname
Ali ibn Kama (10th-cent.–976), Iranian royal, viceroy, and general
Aliyu Kama (born 1949), Nigerian general and politician
Kaido Kama (born 1957), Estonian politician, conservationist, and teacher
Laity Kama (1939–2001), Senegalese barrister and judge
Mesuli Kama (born ?), South African politician
Moustapha Kama (born 1992), Senegalese taekwondo practitioner
Nripa Kama II (1026–1046), Indian monarch
Steven Pirika Kama (1962/63–2016), Papua New Guinean politician

Given name
Kama Chinen (1895–2010), Japanese supercentenarian; among the longest-lived people in recorded history
Kama Ginkas (born 1941), Russian theater director
Kama Massampu (born 1991), French footballer
Kama Mustafa ( The Godfather (wrestler) or Charles Wright; born 1961), American wrestler and actor
Kama Rathod (born ?), Indian politician
Kama Steliga (born 1967), US-born Canadian civil rights activist
Kama Sywor Kamanda (born 1952), Congolese poet, novelist, playwright, essayist, journalist, public speaker, and storyteller
Kama Tarkhan (legendary), Altyn Obaic ancestral king

See also
Monduone N'Kama (born 1960), Congolese footballer

Kamas (disambiguation)
Kaja (name)

References

Serer surnames